Garnes may refer to the following locations in Norway:

Garnes, Ulstein in Ulstein municipality, Møre og Romsdal county
Garnes, Hordaland in Bergen municipality, Hordaland county
Garnes, Trøndelag in Verdal municipality, Trøndelag county